Interorbital may refer to:
Interorbital scales (in snakes)
Interorbital region of the skull
Interorbital Systems